The Cougar is a mine-resistant ambush-protected (MRAP) and infantry mobility vehicle structured to be resistant to landmines and improvised munitions.

It is a family of armored vehicles produced by Force Protection Inc, which manufactures ballistic and mine-protected vehicles. The vehicles are integrated by Spartan Motors. These vehicles are protected against small arms, land mines and improvised explosive devices (IEDs) using a combination of design features and materials to protect both the crew and engine compartment against a wide range of attacks. A Monocoque type, V-shaped hull extends to the engine bay and serves to direct the blast away from under the vehicle.

Development
Force Protection, Inc. was formed in 2002 when Sonic Jet purchased Technical Solutions Group, using the name Sonic Jet until 2004. Technical Solutions Group had been a defense company in the US that was involved in a range of products, including mine-resistant vehicles based on South African designs. A few vehicles were sold to the US Army for evaluation, and a small fleet of heavily protected vehicles was sold to the British Army in 2001.

Some 4,000 of these vehicles were fielded under the US military's MRAP and other vehicle programs. US Defense Secretary Robert Gates demanded that the vehicles be ordered in larger numbers after the Marines reported in 2004 that no troops had died in more than 300 IED attacks on Cougars. Since then, Cougar vehicles have been hit by IEDs many times in Iraq with few fatalities. Britain chose the Cougar over the RG-31 Nyala for their "Mastiff" APV.

Official data states that the Cougar is able to withstand a blast of at least 14 kg (30.86 lb) TNT under a wheel and 7 kg (15.43 lb) TNT under a belly.

Variants
The Cougar comes in two main configurations, a 4×4, and 6×6. It is designed for the transport and protection of troops and equipment, especially against mines or IEDs. The two main configurations come in specific variants.

Cougar HEV (Hardened engineer vehicle) 4×4 and 6×6 vehicles ordered in 2004 by the USMC.

Badger Iraqi Light Armored Vehicle (ILAV)   Based on the Cougar and manufactured by FPII and BAE Systems for the Iraqi Army. The ILAV is based on the Cougar, which can carry ten passengers (the six-wheel version can carry 16). The Cougar/ILAV vehicle uses a capsule design to protect the passengers and key vehicle components from mines and roadside bombs. The larger Cougar costs about $730,000 each, fully equipped. The Cougars have been very popular with American troops, and with Iraqis who have worked with them. 865 ILAVs were ordered by Iraq and 18 by Yemen. The ILAV gives the Iraqis the same degree of protection that most Coalition troops have.

Cougar JERRV (Joint EOD rapid response vehicle) 4×4 and 6×6 variants for the US Army, USAF, and USMC. Approx. 200 ordered in 2005 and 2006, with another 200 ordered in late 2006 but now called MRAPs to take account of the new US military/political initiative to be seen to be responding to public concerns about casualties.

Cougar ISS Based on the Cougar 4×4, the ISS is fitted with an integrated independent suspension system that gives the vehicle increased cross-country mobility.

Ridgback PPV (Protected Patrol Vehicle) British version of the Cougar 4x4 from FPII base vehicles with a British armor package and electronics, including installation of Enforcer remote weapon stations on some vehicles. In 2015, Salisbury coroner David Ridley raised several "points of concern" relating to the vehicle when recording a narrative verdict on the deaths of four soldiers who drowned in Helmand, Afghanistan in June 2010.

Mastiff PPV (Protected Patrol Vehicle) British version of the Cougar 6×6 which arrived in Afghanistan during December 2006, with FPII providing the base vehicle and NP Aerospace in the UK integrating electronics and the British armor package. Mastiff 2 is an improved version with a capacity of 2 + 8 which arrived in Afghanistan during June 2009. The Mastiff is armed with a 7.62 mm GPMG, 12.7 mm heavy machine gun or 40 mm grenade machine gun.

Mastiff 2 'Protected Eyes' A version of the British Mastiff specially designed for the Talisman Counter-IED program. It is fitted with an M151 Protector remote weapon station, mine plow, optical camera and a Honeywell RQ-16 T-Hawk micro air vehicle with screens in the back to display its camera feed.

Wolfhound (Tactical Support Vehicle) British modification of the Cougar 6×6, with FPII providing the base vehicle and NP Aerospace in the UK integrating electronics and the British armor package. The first Wolfhounds entered service in Afghanistan in October 2010. 130 have been ordered for gun tractor and logistical roles.

Timberwolf Cougar variant that was being marketed by Malley Industries of Dieppe, New Brunswick Canada for the replacement of the RG-31 and LAV for the Canadian Forces; Malley Industries lost the contract to Textron TAPV.

Fire Support Cougar Cougar 4x4 chassis fitted with the complete turret and main gun assembly of the Panhard AML-90 armored car. In service with the Djiboutian Army.

Recovery of Airbase Denied by Ordinance (RADBO) Category I Cougar equipped with a U.S. Air Force-designed directed energy weapon, interrogator arm, console, and other features to clear unexploded ordnance from airfields.

Operators

  – 4 used by peacekeeping forces
  – Donated for Burundian forces in Somalia.
  – 6 in service
  for Canadian Forces – 40 Cougar JERRV
  – 4+ US Army donated several Cougar MRAPs to the Croatian Army ISAF contingent in Afghanistan.
  – 41 Cougar loaned, (not leased,) from US. Used in Afghanistan by the army.
  – 12 for Djiboutian Army; some modified to accept 90 mm cannon and turrets adopted from Panhard AML armored cars.
  – 10 in service Georgian Land Forces. Also Georgian HQ units who are part of the ISAF are using the Cougar HEs in the Helmand Province.
  – 3+10 Cougar ordered
  – Badger – 378 ordered in 2007, another 865 ordered by 2011.
  – Cougar HE used in Afghanistan by the Italian Army.
  – Unknown number of Cougar HE appeared in a Moroccan-Chinese movie shooting in Casablanca in which the Moroccan military vehicles were used.
  – 20 Cougar JERRV (Buffalo Explosive Ordnance Disposal version) received from US under Coalition Support Fund in 2010.
  – lent Coughar H used by Polish contingent in Afghanistan from 2008, then 300 bought from US surplus, delivered from June 2022
  – 4 in service with the Romanian Land Forces. Used by EOD troops.
  – 7 in Slovenian Armed Forces service, to be upgraded in 2017 and 2018. Used by EOD units.
  – Donated to Ugandan forces in Somalia.
  – Operates 20 with half being on loan to the OSCE. The UK donated an undisclosed number of Mastiffs following the 2022 Russian invasion of Ukraine in April 2022.
  – 400 Mastiffs, 125 Wolfhounds and 160 Ridgbacks.
 
Blackwater USA
 US Army
 US Navy
 US Marine Corps
 US Air Force
New London Police Department

Operational history

The Cougar is used primarily by the United States Armed Forces and the British Army, as well as law enforcement agencies in the United States. In service with those countries, the Cougar is used in a variety of roles, including the HEV (Hardened Engineer Vehicle) and the Joint Explosive Ordnance Disposal Rapid Response Vehicles (JERRV) while in service with the US Marine Corps, US Navy Seabees, and US Air Force Rapid Engineer Deployable Heavy Operational Repair Squadron Engineers.

Compared to the original Cougar vehicle, the British variant is fitted with large, vertical armor plates that cover the large vision blocks and weapon firing ports. This is in line with British Army doctrine concerning the role of the APC/MICV, specifically that it is to carry troops under protection to the objective and give firepower support when they have disembarked. The Mastiff is fitted with a turret sporting either a L7A2 General Purpose Machine Gun, L110A1 Light Machine Gun, L11A1 Heavy Machine Gun or L134A1 40 mm Grenade Machine Gun. One aspect of the British Army's approach to APC/MICV units (which differs to that of the United States) is that the ability of the average soldier to fire accurately out the ports of a moving IFV has been questioned. The large armor plates add side protection from RPGs or IED explosions.

The British Army has operated an earlier MPV named "Tempest MPV". As of November 2008, the British Army has ordered over 400 Cougar vehicles for deployment in Iraq and Afghanistan following a series of Urgent Operational Requirements (UORs). Deliveries of the first 86 Mastiffs began in February 2007, and an order for 22 further vehicles was placed in March, bringing the total to 108. In October 2007, Gordon Brown announced a further 140 Mastiffs and 157 new Cougar 4x4 variants, named Ridgeback were being ordered to protect troops from mines and roadside bombs.

Canada has deployed the Cougar since October 2007 in Afghanistan.

From November 2008, forty Cougar H were lent by the United States for the Polish contingent in Afghanistan. In Polish service they carried 7.62mm PK machine guns.

On Jan 5, 2012 an Air Force EOD Team, Team Tripwire, 3 Airman, were killed by a remote detonated IED attack.

A British Mastiff suffered an IED attack in Afghanistan in April 2013 which caused three fatalities.

Gallery

References

External links

 "Mastiff" British Army website
 Cougar series Force Protection 
 Cougar MRAP H 4x4 Technical data sheet and pictures Army Recognition
 Cougar MRAP HE 6x6 Technical data sheet and pictures Army Recognition
 Cougar GlobalSecurity.org
 Cougar 4x4 and Cougar 6x6 deagel.com
 News about Cougar  Defense-Update
 Cougar H/HE Armour.ws
 Mastiff Force Protection Vehicle Armedforces.co.uk

Armored fighting vehicles of the United States
Armoured personnel carriers
Armoured fighting vehicles of the post–Cold War period
Military vehicles introduced in the 2000s
Armoured personnel carriers of the post–Cold War period